The 1939–40 Allsvenskan was the sixth season of the top division of Swedish handball. Seven teams competed in the league. Majornas IK won the league, but the title of Swedish Champions was awarded to the winner of Svenska mästerskapet. GoIF Fram were relegated.

League table

Attendance
All teams did not play the same number of home matches since Upsala Studenters IF withdrew during the season.

References 

Swedish handball competitions